The US Post Office-Amsterdam is a historic post office building located at 12-16 Church Street in Amsterdam, Montgomery County, New York. It was built in 1935–1936, and was designed by Louis A. Simon, the Supervising Architect of the Treasury Department in the Colonial Revival style. It consists of a -story, symmetrically massed brick building with 1-story side wings and a large rear wing in the Colonial Revival style.  The interior features a pair of 1939 murals by Henry Schnakenberg (1892–1970).

It was listed on the National Register of Historic Places in 1988.

References

External links

Amsterdam
Government buildings completed in 1936
Colonial Revival architecture in New York (state)
Buildings and structures in Montgomery County, New York
National Register of Historic Places in Montgomery County, New York